Jeanne McNeill is a Democratic member of the Pennsylvania House of Representatives.

Political career
She was elected to replace her deceased husband, Rep. Daniel McNeill (who died while in office), defeating Republican David Molony and Libertarian Samantha X. Dorney.

Running unopposed, McNeill was re-elected to her first full term in the House in the 2018 general election on November 6, 2018. She served on the Environmental Resources and Energy, Game and Fisheries, Labor and Industry, and Local Government committees.

She was re-elected in 2020, again defeating Molony (who operates an "oriental medicine centre" in Catasauqua, Pennsylvania). She stayed on Game & Fisheries and Labor & Industry, and shifted to the Gaming Oversight, Insurance and Rules committees.

References

External links
Official page at the Pennsylvania General Assembly
 Biography at Ballotpedia

Politicians from Allentown, Pennsylvania
Democratic Party members of the Pennsylvania House of Representatives
21st-century American politicians